Bohy is a municipality and village in Plzeň-North District in the Plzeň Region of the Czech Republic. It has about 100 inhabitants.

Administrative parts
The village of Rakolusky is an administrative part of Bohy.

References

Villages in Plzeň-North District